Larry H. Strasburger is an American psychiatrist. He served at the Bridgewater State Hospital and had a contract with McLean Hospital. He also was a vice president of the American Academy of Psychiatry and the Law and later became its president.

References

Living people
American psychiatrists
Year of birth missing (living people)
McLean Hospital physicians